Saint-Romans-lès-Melle (literally Saint-Romans near Melle) is a commune in the Deux-Sèvres department in western France.

See also
Communes of the Deux-Sèvres department

References

Communes of Deux-Sèvres